The St. Vrain's Mill of Mora, New Mexico is a three-story, stone-constructed gristmill built around 1864 by Ceran St. Vrain.  It has also been known as El Molino de Piedra.  The building was added to the National Register of Historic Places in 1973.

See also
Cassidy Mill, also NRHP-listed

References

External links 
 St Vrain Mil Preservation and Historical Foundation

National Register of Historic Places in Mora County, New Mexico
Buildings and structures completed in 1864